Al Roberts (born January 6, 1944) is an American football coach. He serves as the special teams, running backs, and outside linebackers coach for the O'Dea High School in Seattle, Washington.

Playing career
Roberts attended Merced High School in Merced, California and played college football at the University of Washington from 1964 to 1965, and the University of Puget Sound from 1967 to 1968.  He holds a holds a bachelor of arts degree from Puget Sound.

Coaching career
Roberts began his coaching career at Mercer Island High School from 1969 to 1972, then became the head coach at Garfield High School from 1973 to 1976. He was the running backs coach on Don James's staff at Washington from 1977 to 1982.

Roberts joined the Los Angeles Express of the United States Football League (USFL) in 1983 as running backs coach under head coach Hugh Campbell, and followed Campbell to the Houston Oilers in the same capacity from the 1984 and 1985 seasons. After one-year stints on the college staffs at Purdue University (1986) and the University of Wyoming (1987) as running backs and special teams coach, he joined Buddy Ryan with the Philadelphia Eagles in 1988. He served as the Eagles' special teams coach for three seasons. He held the same position with the New York Jets from 1991 to 1993 and the Arizona Cardinals from 1994 to 1995.

Roberts returned to Washington in 1996 as the running backs coach. From 1997 to 2002 he headed the special teams unit for the Cincinnati Bengals.

Family
Roberts and his wife, Arvella, have two sons, Kali and Kyle, and a daughter, Genesis.

References

1944 births
Living people
Arizona Cardinals coaches
Cincinnati Bengals coaches
Florida Tuskers coaches
Houston Oilers coaches
New York Jets coaches
Philadelphia Eagles coaches
Puget Sound Loggers football players
Purdue Boilermakers football coaches
St. Louis Rams coaches
Washington Huskies football coaches
Wyoming Cowboys football coaches
United States Football League coaches
High school football coaches in Washington (state)
Sportspeople from Fresno, California
People from Merced, California
Players of American football from California
African-American coaches of American football
African-American players of American football
21st-century African-American people
20th-century African-American sportspeople